The Milwaukee Road's class "F7" comprised six (#100–#105) high-speed, streamlined 4-6-4 "Baltic" (Hudson) type steam locomotives built by the American Locomotive Company (ALCO) in 1937–38 to haul the Milwaukee's Hiawatha express passenger trains.  Following on from the success of the road's class "A" 4-4-2s, the F7s allowed the road to haul heavier trains on the popular Chicago–Twin Cities routes.

The F7s are major contenders for the fastest steam locomotives ever built, as they ran at over  daily. One run in January 1941 recorded by a reporter for Trains magazine saw  achieved twice—in the midst of a heavy snowstorm. However, the British locomotive LNER Class A4 4468 Mallard is officially accepted to be the world's fastest, with a run recorded at  but authenticated at 126 mph in 1938. The Mallard run was slightly downhill and the locomotive broke down at the end of the run.

The Milwaukee F7s are accepted as the fastest steam locomotives by a different measure—scheduled speed between stations.

In the late 1940s, the Milwaukee F7s were modified to equip an additional Mars Light above the original single highlight to further enhance the safety of daily highspeed operation.

On July 27, 1950, F7 #102 was on a run between Chicago and Milwaukee on the "North Woods Hiawatha." 73 miles from Milwaukee, the right main crosshead froze in its guide. It immediately overheated, broke, and dropped from the guide while the train was traveling at an estimated speed between 90 and over 100 mph. Air brake lines were severed, putting the engine into emergency. The engine was severely damaged, broken drive gear tore up ties and roadbed, and debris (including the main rod) was found as far as 1400 feet west of Edgebrook Station. Information is conflicting on the amount of injuries that resulted; some report that two railroad employees were injured. Another report stated that as the locomotive passed by the Devon Avenue crossing, an automobile driver was injured by flying debris. Whatever the case, no one was killed. The train stayed on the rails, and continued to over 10,560 feet from the station until coming to a complete stop. The cause of the incident was later found to have been caused by the failure of a connection link between the valve gear's combination lever and a Nathan mechanical lubricator. In fact, both of the locomotive's crossheads had been running dry on lubrication, but the right one was the first to fail. After this incident, #102 never ran again, as the cost was not considered worth repairs. 
 
The first one built, #100, was also the first withdrawn from service, on November 10, 1949; and the last one built #105 was the final one in service and was withdrawn August 10, 1951. None survive today, as the last one was scrapped in 1951.

See also 
 Chicago and North Western class E-4 - nine very similar 4-6-4 type locomotives built for the Milwaukee's Chicago competitor, the Chicago and North Western Railway.
 AT&SF class 3460 - six similar 4-6-4 type locomotives with the same boiler pressure and driving wheel size, also used in Chicago by the Santa Fe Railway.

Notes

References

External links 

F7
ALCO locomotives
4-6-4 locomotives
Streamlined steam locomotives
Passenger locomotives
Railway locomotives introduced in 1938
Steam locomotives of the United States
Scrapped locomotives
Standard gauge locomotives of the United States